The Hejaz (also ;) is a region in the west of Saudi Arabia, which includes the cities of Mecca, Medina, Jeddah, Tabuk, Yanbu, Taif and Baljurashi. It is thus known as the "Western Province", and is bordered in the west by the Red Sea, in the north by Jordan, in the east by the Najd, and in the south by the 'Asir Region. It is the most cosmopolitan region in the Arabian Peninsula. Its largest city is Jeddah, which is the second largest city in Saudi Arabia, with Mecca and Medina respectively being the fourth and fifth largest cities in the country.

As the location of the cities of Mecca and Medina, respectively the first and second holiest sites in Islam, the Hejaz is significant in the Arabo-Islamic historical and political landscape. This region is the most populated in Saudi Arabia, and Arabic is the predominant language, as in the rest of Saudi Arabia, with Hejazi Arabic being the most widely spoken dialect here. Some Hejazis are of ethnically diverse origins, although the vast majority are of Arab origin.

According to Islamic tradition, this region is the birthplace of the Islamic prophet Muhammad, who was born in Mecca, which is locally considered to have been founded by his ancestors Abraham, Ishmael, and Hagar. The area became part of his empire through the early Muslim conquests, and it formed part of successive caliphates, first the Rashidun Caliphate, followed by the Umayyad Caliphate, and finally the Abbasid Caliphate. The Ottoman Empire held partial control over the area; after its dissolution, an independent Kingdom of Hejaz existed briefly in 1925 before being conquered by the neighbouring Sultanate of Nejd, creating the Kingdom of Hejaz and Nejd. In September 1932, the Kingdom of Hejaz and Nejd joined the Saudi dominions of Al-Hasa and Qatif, creating the unified Kingdom of Saudi Arabia.

Etymology 
The name of the region is derived from a verb ḥajaza, from the Arabic root ḥ-j-z, meaning "to separate", and it is so called as it separates the land of the Najd in the east from the land of Tihāmah in the west.

History

Prehistoric and ancient times 

One or possibly two megalithic dolmen have been found in Hejaz.

Archaeological research led by of Boston University and the University of Qassim indicates that the river system was active and 2500–3000 BCE.

According to Al-Masudi the northern part of Hejaz was a dependency of the Kingdom of Judah, and according to Butrus al-Bustani the Jews in Hejaz established a sovereign state. The German orientalist Ferdinand Wüstenfeld believed that the Jews established a state in northern Hejaz.

The northern part of the Hejaz was part of the Roman province of Arabia Petraea.

Era of Saleh 

Saudi Arabia's and Hejaz's first World Heritage Site that was recognized by the United Nations Educational, Scientific and Cultural Organization is that of Al-Hijr. The name Al-Ḥijr ("The Land of Stones" or "The Rocky Place") occurs in the Qur'an, and the site is known for having structures carved into rocks, similar to Petra. Construction of the structures is credited to the people of Thamud. The location is also called Madāʾin Ṣāliḥ ("Cities of Saleh"), as it is speculated to be the city in which the Islamic prophet Saleh was sent to the people of Thamud. After the disappearance of Thamud from Mada'in Saleh, it came under the influence of other people, such as the Nabataeans, whose capital was Petra. Later, it would lie in a route used by Muslim Pilgrims going to Mecca.

Era of Abraham and Ishmael 
According to Arab and Islamic sources, the civilization of Mecca started after Ibrāhīm (Abraham) brought his son Ismāʿīl (Ishmael) and wife Hājar (Hagar) here, for the latter two to stay. Some people from the Yemeni tribe of Jurhum settled with them, and Isma'il reportedly married two women, one after divorcing another, at least one of them from this tribe, and helped his father to construct or re-construct the Ka'bah ('Cube'), which would have social, religious, political and historical implications for the site and region.

For example, in Arab or Islamic belief, the tribe of Quraysh would descend from Isma'il ibn Ibrahim, be based in the vicinity of the Ka'bah, and include Muhammad ibn Abdullah ibn Abdul-Muttalib ibn Hashim ibn Abd Manaf. From the Period of Jāhiliyyah ('Ignorance') to the days of Muhammad, the often-warring Arab tribes would cease their hostilities during the time of Pilgrimage, and go on pilgrimage to Mecca, as inspired by Ibrahim. It was during such an occasion that Muhammad met some Madanis who would allow him to migrate to Medina, to escape persecution by his opponents in Mecca.

Era of Muhammad 

As the land of Mecca and Medina, the Hejaz was where Muhammad was born, and where he founded a Monotheistic Ummah of followers, bore patience with his foes or struggled against them, migrated from one place to another, preached or implemented his beliefs, lived and died. Given that he had both followers and enemies here, a number of battles or expeditions were carried out in this area, like those of Al-Aḥzāb ("The Confederates"), Badr and Ḥunayn. They involved both Makkan companions, such as Hamzah ibn Abdul-Muttalib, Ubaydah ibn al-Harith and Sa`d ibn Abi Waqqas, and Madani companions. The Hejaz fell under Muhammad's influence as he emerged victorious over his opponents, and was thus a part of his empire.

Subsequent history 
Due to the presence of the two holy cities in the Hejaz, the region was ruled by numerous empires. The Hejaz was at the center of the Rashidun Caliphate, in particular whilst its capital was Medina from 632 to 656 ACE. The region was then under the control of regional powers, such as Egypt and the Ottoman Empire, throughout much of its later history. After the Ottomans lost control of it, Hejaz became an independent state.

Brief independence 

After the end of the of Ottoman suzerainty and control in Arabia, in 1916, Hussein bin Ali became the leader of an independent State of Hejaz. In 1924, Ali bin Hussein succeeded as the King of Hejaz. Then Ibn Saud succeeded Hussein as the King of Hejaz and Nejd. Ibn Saud ruled the two as separate units, known as the Kingdom of Hejaz and Nejd from 1926 to 1932.

In modern Saudi Arabia 

On 23 September 1932, the two kingdoms of the Hejaz and Nejd were united as the Kingdom of Saudi Arabia. The day is a national holiday called Saudi National Day.

Culture

Religion 
The cultural setting of Hejaz is greatly influenced by that of Islam, especially as it contains its 2 holiest cities, Mecca and Medina. Moreover, the Quran is considered the constitution of Saudi Arabia, and the Sharia is the main legal source. In Saudi Arabia, Islam is not just adhered politically by the government but also it has a great influence on the people's culture and everyday life. The society is in general deeply religious, conservative, traditional, and family-oriented. Many attitudes and traditions are centuries-old, derived from Arab civilization and Islamic heritage.

Cuisine 
Hejazi cuisine has mostly Arabian dishes like the rest of Saudi Arabia. Grilled meat dishes such as shawarma and kebab are well-known in Hejaz. Some dishes are native to the Hejaz, like Saleeg. The Hejazi dishes are known for their spice.

Geography 

The region is located along the Red Sea Rift. It is also known for its darker, more volcanic sand. Depending on the previous definition, the Hejaz includes some of the mountains of the Sarat range, which topographically separate the Najd from Tehamah. Bdellium plants are also abundant in the Hejaz. Saudi Arabia, and in particular the Hejaz, is home to more than 2000 dormant volcanoes.

Flags

Cities 

Al Bahah Region:
 Al-Bāḥah

Medina:
 Al-Madīnah Al-Munawwarah (Medina)
 Badr
 Yanbuʿ al-Baḥr (Yanbu)

Mecca Province:
 Aṭ-Ṭāʾif
 Jiddah (Jeddah)
 Makkah (Mecca)
 Rābigh

Tabuk Region:
 Tabūk

International touristic development 

The project will involve "the development of 22 of the 90+ islands" that lie along the coast to create a "fully integrated luxury mixed-use destination", and will be "governed by laws on par with international standards".

Demographics 
The Hejaz is the most populated region in Saudi Arabia, containing 35% of the population of Saudi Arabia. Most people of Hejaz are Sunnis with a Shia minority in the cities of Medina, Mecca and Jeddah. Many consider themselves more cosmopolitan because Hejaz was for centuries a part of the great empires of Islam from the Umayyads to the Ottomans. People of Hejaz, who feel particularly connected to the holy places of Mecca and Medina, have probably the most strongly articulated identity of any regional grouping in Saudi Arabia.

Gallery

Notable Hejazis 

 Salih of Thamud

Al-Abwa' 

 Musa al-Kazim ibn Ja‘far al-Sadiq, descendant of Muhammad

Mecca

Pre–6th century CE 
 Qusai ibn Kilab ibn Murrah ibn Ka'b ibn Lu'ayy ibn Ghalib ibn Fihr ibn Malik ibn An-Nadr ibn Kinanah ibn Khuzaymah ibn Mudrikah ibn Ilyas ibn Mudar ibn Nizar ibn Ma'ad ibn Adnan the descendant of Isma'il ibn Ibrahim ibn Azar ibn Nahor ibn Serug ibn Reu ibn Peleg ibn Eber ibn Shelakh, Chief of the Tribe of Quraysh, and an ancestor of Muhammad
 Qusai's son Abd-al-Dar the father of Uthman the father of Abdul-Uzza the father of Barrah the maternal grandmother of Muhammad
 Abd Manaf ibn Qusai, paternal ancestor of Muhammad
 Abdul-Uzza, son of Qusai, and an ancestor of Barrah bint Abdul-Uzza
 Hashim, son of Abd Manaf, paternal great-grandfather of Muhammad, and the progenitor of Banu Hashim in the Tribe of Quraysh
 Hubbah bint Hulail ibn Hubshiyyah ibn Salul ibn Ka‘b ibn Amr al-Khuza'i, wife of Qusai, and an ancestor of Muhammad
 Atikah bint Murrah ibn Hilal ibn Falij ibn Dhakwan, wife of Abd Manaf, and an ancestor of Muhammad

Since 
 Muhammad ibn Abdullah ibn Abdul-Muttalib
 Abu Bakr Abdullah ibn Uthman Abu Quhafah ibn Amir ibn Amr ibn Ka'b ibn Sa'd ibn Taym ibn Murrah ibn Ka'b, father-in-law of Muhammad, and Caliph
 Umar ibn Al-Khattab ibn Nufayl ibn Abdul-Uzza the descendant of Adi ibn Ka'b ibn Lu'ayy, father-in-law of Muhammad, and Caliph
 Ali ibn Abi Talib, cousin and son-in-law of Muhammad, and Caliph
 Hamzah, son of Abdul-Muttalib, and a paternal uncle of Muhammad, and other Muhajirun or Makkan followers of Muhammad, including Ubaydah and Sa'd
 Abu Talib, son of Abdul-Muttalib, Chief of Banu Hashim, paternal uncle of Muhammad, and the father of Ali
 Abd al-Muttalib ibn Hashim, Chief of Bani Hashim, and the paternal grandfather of Muhammad
 Khadijah bint Khuwaylid ibn Asad ibn Abdul-Uzza ibn Qusai, and other Meccan wives of Muhammad
 Fatimah, other daughters of Muhammad, and other Muhajir women
 Umm Ammar Sumayyah bint Khayyat, wife of Yasir ibn Amir ibn Malik al-Ansi, believed to be the first martyr from the followers of Muhammad
 Aminah bint Wahb ibn Abd Manaf ibn Zuhrah ibn Kilab ibn Murrah, wife of Abdullah, and the mother of Muhammad

Medina

Pre–6th century CE 
 Salmah, daughter of Amr, wife of Hashim, and a great-grandmother of Muhammad

Since 
 Caliph Al-Hasan, and other sons of Ali and grandsons of Muhammad born in Medina
 Caliph Umar ibn Abdul-Aziz ibn Marwan ibn Al-Hakam ibn Abi al-'As ibn Umayyah ibn Abd Shams ibn Abd Manaf ibn Qusai, great-grandson of Umar ibn Al-Khattab
 Al-Hasan of Basra
 Muhammad al-Baqir ibn Ali Zaynul-Abidin, grandson of Hasan and Husayn the grandsons of Muhammad
 Zayd ibn Ali Zaynul-Abidin ibn Husayn ibn Fatimah bint Muhammad, half-brother of Muhammad al-Baqir
 Ansari women
 Ja'far al-Sadiq ibn Muhammad al-Baqir
 Malik the son of Anas ibn Malik ibn Abi Amir al-Asbahi (not Anas the companion of Muhammad)
 Ali al-Ridha ibn Musa al-Kadhim ibn Ja'far al-Sadiq
 Fatimah bint Musa ibn Ja'far, sister of Ali al-Ridha
 Abu Ali Muhammad al-Jawad ibn Ali al-Ridha

Ta'if

6th–7th centuries CE 
 Uthman ibn Affan ibn Abu al-'As ibn Umayyah ibn Abd Shams ibn Abd Manaf, son-in-law of Muhammad, and Caliph
 Urwah ibn Mas'ud, Chief of Banu Thaqif
 Nafi ibn al-Harith, Physician

Since 
 Sharif Ali ibn Ajlan ibn Rumaithah ibn Muhammad, son-in-law and successor of Sultan Ahmad of Brunei, father of Sultan Sulaiman, and a descendant of Muhammad

See also 

 Al Baydha Project
 Desert of Paran
 Hejaz Vilayet
 Hejazi turban
 Hijazi script
 Midian
 Relationship between the Hijaz, Shaam and Yemen
 Sharifate of Mecca
 History of the Jews in Saudi Arabia

Explanatory notes

References

Further reading 
  PBK, first edition: 1987.

External links 

 

 
Geography of Saudi Arabia
Historical regions
Historical regions in Saudi Arabia
Megalithic monuments in the Middle East
Red Sea